The 1901–02 season was Stoke's 13th season in the Football League.

Stoke failed to improve from last season's narrow escape and again required a final day survival, Stoke stayed up after a 2–2 draw with Manchester City one point more than Small Heath who could only draw 0–0 with Notts County and were relegated.

Season review

League
Stoke now without William Maxwell struggled again in 1901–02. With winger Freddie Johnson now skippering the side, Stoke again took 16th position in the First Division avoiding relegation by a single point thanks mainly to a four match unbeaten run at the end of the season. The relegation battle came to a crescendo in April with literally 14 of the 18 teams in the division in danger of the drop, with 3rd placed Newcastle United only avoiding relegation by seven points.

At the start of April the bottom of the table was tight with Stoke having one of the poorest goal-averages, and away trips to Notts County and Manchester City were favourites to go down. But again, Stoke escaped after switching 5 ft 5 inch half-back Tom Holford to centre forward for the last four games which ended in a 1–1 draw at Notts County, home wins 4–0 and 2–0 over Bolton and Grimsby respectively and a last gasp 2–2 draw with Manchester City where Holford scored his third goal in succession. Stoke could have gone down right at the death if Small Heath had beaten Notts County in their last match but they drew 0–0 and both the Birmingham club and Manchester City were relegated. One of Stoke's most bizarre events in their history occurred in January 1902 when the team fell ill with food poisoning just before a league match away at Liverpool. The players had eaten fish at the Adelphi Hotel and were violently sick in the dressing room at Anfield. Soon into the match goalkeeper Leigh Richmond Roose had to leave the pitch and Stoke went on to lose 7–0.

FA Cup
Stoke fared better in the FA Cup this season beating Aston Villa and Bristol Rovers before losing to Nottingham Forest in the third round.

Final league table

Results
Stoke's score comes first

Legend

Football League First Division

FA Cup

Squad statistics

References

Stoke City F.C. seasons
Stoke